The Oregon Ducks college football team competes as part of the  NCAA Division I Football Bowl Subdivision (FBS), representing the University of Oregon in the North Division of the Pac-12 Conference (Pac-12). Since the establishment of the team in 1893, Oregon has appeared in 36 bowl games. Included in these games are 8 combined appearances in the traditional "big four" bowl games (the Rose, Sugar, Cotton, and Orange) and 3 Bowl Championship Series (BCS) game appearances, including one in the BCS National Championship Game. Through the history of the program, 7 separate coaches have led the Ducks to bowl games with Mike Bellotti having the most appearances with 12. From 2009 to 2012, Chip Kelly was Oregon's head coach, and led the Ducks to BCS bowl appearances in each of his four seasons at Oregon. After losses in both the 2010 Rose Bowl and the 2011 BCS National Championship Game, Kelly led the Ducks to a victory in the 2012 Rose Bowl over Wisconsin and in the 2013 Fiesta Bowl over Kansas State. Oregon has played in 36 bowl games and has a overall bowl record of 16 wins and 20 losses, and their most common bowl opponents have been Colorado and Ohio State, meeting a total of 3 against both, respectively.

Key

Post-season games

Notes

References
General

Specific

Oregon Ducks

Oregon Ducks bowl games